Paik Jong-won's Food Truck is a South Korean cooking-variety program which was broadcast from July 21, 2017 to December 29, 2017. It is a spin-off of the cooking-variety program Paik Jong-won's Top 3 Chef King. The program was hosted by Paik Jong-won and Kim Sung-joo, it aired on SBS every Friday at 23:20 (KST).

Since January 5, 2018, the show was spun off to Paik Jong-won's Alley Restaurant.

Broadcast Timeline

Cast

Host
 Paik Jong-won
 Kim Sung-joo

Special host
 Sunny (Girls' Generation) (Episode 97)

List of Episodes

References

External links
Paik's Food Truck on SBS official website 

2017 South Korean television series debuts
2017 South Korean television series endings
Korean-language television shows
Seoul Broadcasting System original programming
South Korean variety television shows
South Korean cooking television series